Louise Troy (November 9, 1933 – May 5, 1994) was an American actress of stage and screen. She is best known for her performances in Tovarich (1963) and Walking Happy (1966), for both of which roles she was nominated for Tony Awards. Her signature stage role was that of the lead in High Spirits (1964).

Personal life
Born in Manhattan, Troy was the only child of Jewish parents: Ella Ziebel and Seymour Troy (original family name: Taradajka ). Her mother was an actress In the New York Yiddish theater, as was her grandmother, Frida Gespass, and her grandmother's sisters, Helene Gespass and Ella Gespass Wallerstein. The Gespass sisters, originally from Lemberg, Austria, were part of the founding generation of the Yiddish theater in America. Her father was a major designer and manufacturer of women's shoes. She studied with Lee Strasberg and at the American Academy of Dramatic Arts.

Career
In 1955, Troy first appeared off-Broadway in The Infernal Machine. She made her Broadway debut in the musical Pipe Dream (1955). She received critical acclaim for her role opposite Edward Woodward, Tammy Grimes, Carol Arthur, and the legendary Beatrice Lillie in the 1964 musical High Spirits, which was based on Noël Coward's comedy, Blithe Spirit.

She was also known for her guest appearances on the television show Hogan's Heroes, on which her then husband Werner Klemperer starred as "Colonel Klink".
Her other TV appearances included Kate and Allie, Room 222, The Odd Couple, Cannon, and Honey West, among others. In the 1970s, she appeared on the long running daytime soap opera The Guiding Light, twice (as Audrey Frost Mills in 1974, and as Gladys Shields in 1978). She appeared in the first season of Barnaby Jones (in the episode: "To Denise, with Love and Murder", which aired on April 22, 1973). Her film appearances include Yours, Mine and Ours (1968), The Swimmer (1968) and Ghostbusters II (1989).

Marriage
Troy was first married to actor Werner Klemperer, from 1969 until they divorced in 1975, She then married her second husband, actor and director Douglas Seale in 1992, they remained married until her death in 1994, aged 60. Both unions were childless.

Death
Troy died of breast cancer at the age of 60 in 1994 at her home in New York City.

Recognition
Troy was nominated for the following Tony Awards:
1963 - Actress, Supporting or Featured (Musical) for her work in Tovarich
1964 - Actress, Supporting or Featured (Musical) for her work in High Spirits
1967 - Actress (Musical) for her work in Walking Happy.

Filmography

References

External links
 
 

1933 births
1994 deaths
Actresses from New York City
American Academy of Dramatic Arts alumni
American musical theatre actresses
American television actresses
Deaths from cancer in New York (state)
Deaths from breast cancer
Jewish American actresses
20th-century American actresses
20th-century American singers
20th-century American women singers
20th-century American Jews